Nicole Rogers is a female English international indoor bowler.

Bowls career
In 2018, she won the English indoor title and the under 25 title at the IIBC Championships. She reached the semi finals of the women's singles at the 2020 World Indoor Bowls Championship.

Personal life
She is a student at the University of Exeter.

References

1998 births
English female bowls players
Living people